The 2021 GT America Series was the inaugural season of the SRO Motorsports Group's GT America Series, an auto racing series for grand tourer cars. The races were contested with GT2-spec, GT3-spec and GT4-spec cars. The season began at Sonoma on March 6, and ended at Indianapolis on October 17.

Calendar
The final calendar was released on October 26, 2020

Entry list

Race results
Bold indicates overall winner.

Championship standings
Scoring system
Championship points are awarded for the first ten positions in each race. Entries are required to complete 75% of the winning car's race distance in order to be classified and earn points.

Drivers' championships

GT3

GT2